is a Japanese animation studio that is a division of Silver Link. The studio was initially founded as a separate company,  in April of 2012 as a subsidiary of Silver Link, but was later wholly absorbed and dissolved into its parent company on July 17, 2020, and it subsequently became a sub-studio within the company.

A majority of Connect's early works are co-productions with its parent company. Starting with the Monster Strike web anime, the studio was working less with its parent company, producing solo productions such as Senryu Girl, Oresuki, and The Honor Student at Magic High School.

Works

Television series

OVA/ONAs

References

External links

 

 
Animation studios in Tokyo
Japanese companies established in 2012
Mass media companies established in 2012
Japanese animation studios
Japanese companies disestablished in 2020
Mass media companies disestablished in 2020